"Best on Earth" (stylized in all caps) is a song by American rapper Russ featuring rapper Bia. It was released as the fourth single from Russ's fourteenth studio album Shake the Snow Globe (2020) on October 17, 2019. The song was produced by Boi-1da and Jahaan Sweet, and samples "Some Cut" The Lil Jon produced single by American hip hop group Trillville.

Music video
A music video was released on November 5, 2019. In it, Russ and Bia are at a party with many women twerking and draped in lingerie. "Russ also covers the basement floor in dollar bills, as he sits down to take in the scene and enjoy some hookah."

Reception 
On October 18, 2019, Rihanna took to Instagram to post a video of the song with the captions, "thank you @bia and @russ for my new fav song #BestOnEarth". The two rappers both received a cosign from Rihanna, which they expressed appreciation for. On September 29, 2020, Bia's verse from the record received a nomination for the BET Hip Hop Awards in the “Sweet 16: Best Featured Verse” category. Russ received his first music industry award for the single at the 2021 BMI R&B/Hip-Hop Awards.

Chart performance
"Best on Earth" debuted at number 100 on the US Billboard Hot 100 chart, on the week of December 21, 2019. The song became Russ' third and Bia's first to appear on the chart. After climbing the chart for three months, the song reached its peak at number 46 on the week of March 28, 2020. On May 13, 2020, the single was certified platinum by the Recording Industry Association of America (RIAA) for combined sales and streaming units of over a million units in the United States. On January 7, 2022 the single was certified 2x Multi-Platinum.

Charts

Weekly charts

Year-end charts

Certifications

References

2020 singles
2020 songs
Russ (rapper) songs
Bia (rapper) songs
Columbia Records singles
Songs written by Boi-1da
Songs written by Lil Jon
Song recordings produced by Boi-1da